Statistics of Czechoslovak First League in the 1925–26 season.

Overview
It was contested by 12 teams, and Sparta Prague won the championship. Jan Dvořáček was the league's top scorer with 32 goals.

League standings

Results

Top goalscorers

References

Czechoslovakia - List of final tables (RSSSF)

Czechoslovak First League seasons
1925–26 in Czechoslovak football
Czech